Group 2 of the 1954 FIFA World Cup took place from 17 to 23 June 1954. The group consisted of Hungary, South Korea, Turkey, and West Germany.

Standings

Matches
All times listed are local time (CET, UTC+1).

West Germany vs Turkey

Hungary vs South Korea

Hungary vs West Germany

Turkey vs South Korea

Play-off: West Germany vs Turkey

References

External links
 1954 FIFA World Cup archive

Group 2
West Germany at the 1954 FIFA World Cup
Hungary at the 1954 FIFA World Cup
Turkey at the 1954 FIFA World Cup
South Korea at the 1954 FIFA World Cup